The building for the Headquarters of the Peruvian Army (Spanish: Cuartel General del Ejército del Perú), known among locals as the Little Pentagon (Spanish: Pentagonito), is a building complex located in the San Borja District of Lima that serves as the Headquarters of the Peruvian Army.

History

Background
In January 1971, the then Commander General of the Army and Minister of War, Major General Ernesto Montagne Sánchez, made the decision that the new premises for the Army Headquarters should respond to functional and security conditions in a wide area which would allow it to centralize all the organizations of the War Sector, the High Command of the Army and its Support, Advisory and Service Bodies, which, at the time, found themselves  dispersed.

Planning and construction

In April 1971, the land, located in the Chacarilla del Estanque residential area, then belonging to the district of Surco (today San Borja) and with an area of 949,696 m2, was selected and the expropriation process began, whose appraisal was carried out by experts of the Ministry of Housing and Construction, simultaneously the topographic survey was carried out by the Military Geographical Institute. In mid-1971, a group of highly qualified architects was invited to discuss and criticize the preliminary project in order to choose between several alternatives. In October 1971, a coordinated plan between different construction firms under the supervision of the military began, with a deadline of 9 months, with priority to urban rehabilitation.

The project was divided into six sectors. In July 1973, Sector I – the main building – was put out to tender. Construction began on December 5, 1973, with a delivery deadline of December 1, 1974. The rest of the complex followed soon after in December 1973, being awarded in January 1974. Simultaneously, a process of urban reforestation began in both the interior and exterior of the complex with the intent of improving the air quality of the surrounding area.

On January 22, 1975, the official inauguration of the new premises of the Ministry of War Complex was held, with the presence of the then President, Juan Velasco Alvarado, as well as other authorities. It began operating in mid-1976, due to the fact that some installations had not been completed.

Gallery

See also
Military of Peru
Peruvian Army
San Borja District

Notes

References

Peruvian Army
Buildings and structures in Lima
Tourist attractions in Lima
Military headquarters
Brutalist architecture